Estrella D. Alfon (July 18, 1917 – December 28, 1983) was a Filipina author who wrote in English. She held an AA degree from the University of the Philippines and was a member of the UP Writers Club.

Personal life
Estrella Alfon was born in Cebu City in 1917. Her parents were shopkeepers. She attended college, studying medicine. After being mistakenly diagnosed with tuberculosis and sent to a sanitarium, she resigned from her pre-medical education, leaving with an Associate of Arts degree.

Alfon had several children: Alan Rivera, Esmeralda "Mimi" Rivera, Brian Alfon, Estrella "Twinkie" Alfon, and Rita "Daday" Alfon (deceased). She had ten grandchildren. Her youngest daughter was a stewardess for Saudi Arabian Airlines, and was part of the Flight 163 crew on August 19, 1980, when an in-flight fire forced the aircraft to land in Riyadh. A delayed evacuation resulted in the death of all aboard the flight.

Alfon died on December 28, 1983, following a heart attack suffered on-stage during the Manila Film Festival Awards Night.

Career
While a student in Cebu when, Alfon published her first short stories, in periodicals such as Graphic Weekly Magazine, Philippine Magazine, and the Sunday Tribune. She was a prolific storywriter, playwright, and journalist. In spite of being a Cebuana, she wrote almost exclusively in English. She published her first story, “Grey Confetti”, in the Graphic in 1935. Alfon was at times charged with sloppy writing and suspected of writing exclusively for profit, rather than passion.

She was the only female member of the Veronicans, an avant-garde group of writers in the 1930s led by Francisco Arcellana and H.R. Ocampo, being also regarded as their muse. The Veronicans are recognized as the first group of Filipino writers to write almost exclusively in English and were formed prior to the World War II. Alfon was a regular contributor to Manila-based national magazines, having several stories cited in Jose Garcia Villa’s annual honor rolls. Thelma E. Arambulo described her in the following way:

In the 1950s, her short story, "Fairy Tale for the City", was condemned by the Catholic League of the Philippines as being "obscene". She was even brought to court on these charges. While many of her fellow writers did stand by her, some did not. These events hurt her deeply.

In spite of having only a basic A.A. degree, she was eventually appointed as a professor of Creative Writing at the University of the Philippines, Manila. She held the National Fellowship in Fiction post at the U.P. Creative Writing Center in 1979. She would also serve on the Philippine Board of Tourism in the 1970s.

Awards
 1940: A collection of her early short stories, “Dear Esmeralda,” won Honorable Mention in the Commonwealth Literary Award.
 1961-1962: Four of her one-act plays won all the prizes in the Arena Theater Play Writing Contest: “Losers Keepers” (first prize), “Strangers” (second prize), “Rice” (third prize), and “Beggar” (fourth prize).
 1961-1962: Won top prize in the Palanca Contest for “With Patches of Many Hues.”
 1974: Second place Palanca Award for her short story, "The White Dress".
 1979: National Fellowship in Fiction post at the U.P. Creative Writing Center.
Alfon won the Palanca Awards a number of times:
 Forever Witches, one-act play (Third place, 1960)
 With Patches of Many Hues, one-act play (First place, 1962)
 Tubig, One-act Play (Second place, 1963)
 The Knitting Straw, one-act play, (Third place, 1968)
 The White Dress, short story (Second place, 1974)

Partial bibliography
 Magnificence and Other Stories (1960)
 Stories of Estrella Alfon (1994) (published posthumously)
 Servant Girl (short story)

Legacy
In an interview, Luisa Igloria said of Alfon:

References

External links and other sources
 www.bisaya.com Visayan Literature page—defunct
 www.sushidog.com Servant Girl (Short Story)
 The History of Filipino Women's Writings by Riitta Vartti
 Full Text: Rice by Estrella Alfon
 Full Text: Magnificence by Estrella Alfon
 Analysis of Magnificience on Lit React

1917 births
1983 deaths
Cebuano writers
University of the Philippines alumni
Filipino women writers
People from Cebu City
Writers from Cebu
English-language writers from the Philippines
20th-century women writers
20th-century Filipino writers